Marco Bigio, also known as Giorgio da Siena) (active 1523 to 1550) was an Italian painter of the Renaissance period, active mainly in Siena.

Biography
Little is known about the life of the painter. He is putatively a pupil of Sodoma, and an attributed work in the Palazzo Barberini Gallery, has been attributed to one or both of these artists. Filippo Boni indicates that his style resembles that of Antonio Maria Lari (Il Tozzo).

Among the works attributed to Bigio are:
Holy Family with young St John the Baptist (1540), 49 × 33 cm,
The Three Parcae of Fates"" (1540-1550), 200 × 212, Galleria Nazionale d'Arte Antica in Palazzo Barberini, RomeThree Ages of WomanMadonna and Child and Magdalen, 80 cm,Magdalen, 133,5 × 97 cm,Magdalen in prayer with a seascape', 112 × 93,5 cm,Madonna and Child, St John and Angels'', tempera, 66 × 66 cm.

References

Date of birth unknown
Date of death unknown
16th-century Italian painters
Italian male painters
Painters from Siena
Italian Renaissance painters